Percy Rivington Pyne Jr. (November 9, 1896 – December 9, 1941) was an American fighter pilot who fought in World War I.

Biography
He was born on November 9, 1896 in Tuxedo Park, New York to Percy Rivington Pyne II and Maud Howland.

He entered Princeton University with the class of 1918. He was a pioneer of the Princeton Aviation School and left before graduating to join the American Expeditionary Force.

Pyne was awarded the Distinguished Service Cross for extraordinary heroism in action while serving with 103d Aero Squadron, 3d Pursuit Group, U.S. Army Air Service, A.E.F., near Dun-sur-Meuse, France, 23 October 1918.

After the war Pyne returned to Princeton to complete his studies and received a B.A. degree. He then went to New College, Oxford and received the degrees of Bachelor of Arts and Master of Arts.

Pyne died on December 9, 1941 in Manhattan, New York City at the age of 45 after a long illness. He was buried in Woodlawn Cemetery.

References

1896 births
1941 deaths
Princeton University alumni
Alumni of New College, Oxford
United States Army Air Service pilots of World War I
Recipients of the Distinguished Service Cross (United States)
Burials at Woodlawn Cemetery (Bronx, New York)
Pyne banking family
Rivington family